Carlos Andrés Abella Parra (born 25 January 1986) is a Colombian football coach and former player who played as a goalkeeper.

Career
Abella was the first-choice goalkeeper for Boyacá Chicó F.C. in the 2012 Categoría Primera A season. He previously played for Atlético Huila.

He was one of the goalies who took part in Colombia national under-20 football team that won the Sudamericana and went to the 2005 FIFA World Youth Championship.

References

External links

1986 births
Living people
People from Huila Department
Colombian footballers
Colombia under-20 international footballers
Categoría Primera A players
Atlético Huila footballers
Envigado F.C. players
Atlético Bucaramanga footballers
Boyacá Chicó F.C. footballers
Association football goalkeepers
Categoría Primera A managers
Atlético Huila managers